László Barsi (25 June 1904 – 6 September 1975) was a Hungarian sprinter who competed in the 1928 Summer Olympics. He was born in Levice and died in Budapest.

References

1904 births
1975 deaths
People from Levice
Sportspeople from the Nitra Region
Hungarian male sprinters
Hungarian male middle-distance runners
Olympic athletes of Hungary
Athletes (track and field) at the 1928 Summer Olympics
20th-century Hungarian people